Cibles is a French magazine that publishes articles about firearms and militaria. The magazine was launched in 1967. Its publisher is Crépin-Leblond. It is sold at newsstands in Belgium, France, and Switzerland.

References

External links
 

1967 establishments in France
French-language magazines
Magazines established in 1967
Magazines published in Paris
Military magazines published in France
Monthly magazines published in France